The Măgura is a right tributary of the river Bahlui in Romania. It flows into the Bahlui in Hodora.

References

Rivers of Romania
Rivers of Iași County